The 1957 Purdue Boilermakers football team was an American football team that represented Purdue University during the 1957 Big Ten Conference football season. In their second season under head coach Jack Mollenkopf, the Boilermakers compiled a 5–4 record, finished in a tie for fourth place in the Big Ten Conference with a 4–3 record against conference opponents, and outscored all opponents by a total of 178 to 114.

Notable players included quarterbacks Bob Spoo and Ross Fichtner and tackle Nick Mumley.

Schedule

Roster

References

Purdue
Purdue Boilermakers football seasons
Purdue Boilermakers football